Patrick Horgan (born 1957) is an Irish retired hurler who played as a centre-forward for the Cork senior team.

Horgan joined the team during the 1977 championship and was a regular member of the starting fifteen until his retirement after the 1988 championship. During that time he won three All-Ireland medals as a non-playing substitute, six Munster medals, two National League medals and two All-Star awards. Horgan was an All-Ireland runner-up on two occasions.

At club level Horgan was a one-time All-Ireland medalist with Glen Rovers. In addition to this he has also won one Munster medal and two county club championship medals.

Honours

Team
Glen Rovers
All-Ireland Senior Club Hurling Championship (1): 1977
Munster Senior Club Hurling Championship (1): 1976
Cork Senior Club Hurling Championship (2): 1976, 1989

Cork
All-Ireland Senior Hurling Championship (3): 1977 (sub), 1978 (sub), 1984 (sub)
Munster Senior Hurling Championship (8): 1977, 1978, 1979, 1982, 1983, 1984, 1985, 1986
National Hurling League (2): 1979-80, 1980-81
All-Ireland Under-21 Hurling Championship (1): 1976
Munster Under-21 Hurling Championship (2): 1976, 1977
All-Ireland Minor Hurling Championship (1): 1974
Munster Minor Hurling Championship (2): 1974, 1975

Munster
Railway Cup (2): 1981, 1984 (sub)

References

1957 births
Living people
Glen Rovers hurlers
Cork inter-county hurlers
Munster inter-provincial hurlers